Austin Henry Guerrero Loomer (born March 24, 1989) is an American professional soccer player who plays as a goalkeeper for San Diego Loyal SC in the USL Championship.

Youth career
Born in Chula Vista, California, Guerrero played for prominent youth side Surf Soccer Club in San Diego, CA.  While at Surf Soccer Club, he led his team to a peak ranking of #10 nationally while winning the 2006 Region IV Championship.  Guerrero also started for the Cal South ODP team from 2002 to 2007 and Region IV ODP team from 2003 to 2007.  With Guerrero in goal, the Cal South ODP side won the 2006 National ODP Championship and the Region IV team won National ODP Championships in 3 consecutive years from 2004 to 2006.  Guerrero was invited to the renowned Adidas ESP Camp in 2006 and was recognized in the camp's First XI honors and was awarded the Golden Glove for the camp.

Coming out of high school, Guerrero was rated the No. 16 high school recruit and No. 3 goalkeeper in US according to Rise Magazine.  He committed to playing collegiate soccer at the University of Portland under coach Bill Irwin.

College career
In 2007, in his debut season at the University of Portland, Guerrero was named to the Copa de Causeway All-Tournament Team and won WCC League Player of the Week honors on October 8, registering 9 saves in a shutout against San Diego.  At one point, he held a scoreless streak of 435 consecutive minutes without allowing a goal.  Ultimately, Guerrero led the Portland to an NCAA playoff appearance after leading the WCC in shutouts (8) and saves (85).  He was named to the All-WCC First Team and All-Freshman team, in addition to being named to Soccer America's National All-Freshman Team, Top Drawer Soccers National All-Rookie Team, and College Soccer News National All-Freshman Second Team.  At the end of the season, Guerrero was called into the United States Under-20 National Team camp to play Honduras.

During the 2008 season, Guerrero was named as an All-WCC Honorable Mention after leading the WCC League in saves (91) and making 7 saves in a match on 5 separate occasions.

During the 2009 season, Guerrero was named the Smith Barney Classic Defensive Player of the Tournament after leading Portland to winning the tournament.  He was also named to the Soccer America National Team of the Week and WCC League Player of the Week honors on September 28 after leading Portland to the Husky Fever Classic Tournament Championship.  Guerrero ultimately ranked second in the WCC league in goals against average (0.95), save percentage (.784), and saves (80), while ranking third in shutouts (5).  He led Portland to the NCAA playoff quarterfinals to end the season.  At the end of the season, he was named to the All-WCC First Team and a Top Drawer Soccers Honorable Mention for his performance on the season.

In his final 2010 season in Portland, Guerrero showed his class while making a career high 10 saves in a single match against Washington.  He ended the season ranking second in the WCC League in shutouts (6), saves (90), and save percentage (.789). He was named to the All-WCC First team and a 2nd Team West Region All-American.

When closing his university career at Portland, Guerrero was a three-time All-WCC First Team performer.  He recorded the most WCC league shutouts for a career (16) and single season (6 - 2007) in league history.  Guerrero sat in the Portland Pilots' record book among prominent goalkeeping legends Kasey Keller and Luis Robles as the all-time leader in saves (346), was second in appearances (82), third in shutouts (22), and seventh in goals against average (1.17).  After completing his time at Portland, Guerrero signed with Tigres UANL.

Professional career

Portland Timbers U23s
Guerrero appeared in 10 matches for the Portland Timbers U23s during 2009, leading the team to a PDL playoff berth.  The team was eventually eliminated by the Seattle Wolves by a score of 3-2 in the playoffs.

UANL Tigres
Guerrero was signed by Liga MX side Tigres UANL after his time in the United States.  Despite not getting as many first team matches as he would have preferred, he took this period to refine his skills in an elite professional setting and attributed his exceptional distribution to this developmental period in Mexico.

Altamira
Guerrero joined Altamira FC on loan from Tigres in 2013 in order to get more competitive playing time, and appeared in 32 Ascenso MX and Copa MX matches for the club.  He led the club into the Liguilla Playoffs, but they were eventually eliminated.  Altamira FC was then dissolved after the 2015 Clausura tournament, and Guerrero again sought to play for a Liga MX side.

Puebla
Guerrero joined Puebla FC during 2015 and showed well in a 1-0 friendly victory over Boca Juniors.  He represented the club in reserve team matches and appeared for the first team on the bench as a substitute while honing his skills behind an experienced goalkeeping corps.

Career statistics

Club

International

References

External links
http://www.puebla-fc.com/jugadores/68/austin-guerrero

 Portland Pilots bio

1989 births
Living people
American soccer players
Association football goalkeepers
Altamira F.C. players
Club Puebla players
Reno 1868 FC players
Portland Timbers U23s players
Alianza Panama players
North Carolina FC players
Liga MX players
Ascenso MX players
Liga Panameña de Fútbol players
USL Championship players
American sportspeople of Mexican descent
Sportspeople from Chula Vista, California
Soccer players from California
American expatriate soccer players
American expatriate sportspeople in Panama
Expatriate footballers in Panama
United States men's under-20 international soccer players
San Diego Loyal SC players